Lucknow–New Delhi AC Superfast Express numbered 12429/30 is an ISO certified premier daily overnight service of AC Superfast Express type running between  and  operated by Northern Railway zone and hauled by an Indian locomotive class WAP-5 of Indian Railways.

Overview
This is a fully air conditioned Superfast train which connects the Indian capital, New Delhi to the state capital of Uttar Pradesh, Lucknow. It has been introduced in lieu of two trains (Lucknow–New Delhi AC Duronto Express & Lucknow–New Delhi AC Express) that have previously served Lucknow Charbagh & New Delhi from 15 June 2014. The train is the first train of Northern Railway zone to be operated on German Technology LHB coach from 12 April 2016.

Lucknow–New Delhi AC Express (12429/12430) can now accommodate 960 passengers instead of 824. The number of seats in AC-2 coaches has been increased from 44 to 52, while in AC-3 coaches it has been raised from 64 to 72. The new coaches, based on a German technology LHB coach, are made of stainless steel which do not turn turtle during accidents. The light-weight coaches will also improve the train's speed. Bigger windows, lamps at all seats and sound insulation are the other features. Waste from toilets would get discharged only when the train would be in motion.

Rakes
Coach composition are as follows:

Gallery

See also
 Lucknow Mail
 Lucknow Swarna Shatabdi Express
 List of named passenger trains of India

Notes

External links 
 https://searchmytrain.com/12429-lucknow-new-delhi-supfast-express-lko-ndls/timetable-route-map Lucknow to New Delhi Rajdhani Express (Up)
 https://searchmytrain.com/12430-new-delhi-lucknow-supfast-express-ndls-lko/timetable-route-map New Delhi to Lucknow Rajdhani Express (Down)

References

 http://timesofindia.indiatimes.com/city/lucknow/New-train-from-Lucknow-to-Delhi-and-back/articleshow/36613952.cms

Passenger trains originating from Lucknow
Rail transport in Delhi
Railway services introduced in 2014
AC Express (Indian Railways) trains
Transport in Delhi